The National Romantic style was a Nordic architectural style that was part of the National Romantic movement during the late 19th and early 20th centuries. It is often considered to be a form of Art Nouveau.

The National Romantic style spread across Denmark, Norway, Sweden, Finland, Estonia, and Latvia, as well as Russia, where it also appeared as Russian Revival architecture. Unlike some nostalgic Gothic Revival style architecture in some countries, Romantic architecture often expressed progressive social and political ideals, through reformed domestic architecture.

Nordic designers turned to early medieval architecture and even prehistoric precedents to construct a style appropriate to the perceived character of people. The style can be seen as a reaction to industrialism and an expression of the same "Dream of the North" Romantic nationalism that gave impetus to renewed interest in the study of the history of Scandinavia, along with the rediscovery of the eddas and sagas of Nordic mythology.

Examples 
 Bergen Station (Bergen stasjon) (1913, Norway)
 Copenhagen City Hall (Københavns Rådhus) (1905, Denmark)
  (Königlich-Sächsisches Landgericht) (1902, Germany) 
 Finnish National Theatre (Suomen Kansallisteatteri) (1902, Finland)
 Frogner Church (Frogner kirke) (1907, Norway)
 Holdre Manor (Holdre mõis) (1910, Estonia)
 National Museum of Finland (Suomen Kansallismuseo) (1905, Finland)
 Norwegian Institute of Technology (Norges tekniske høgskole) (1910, Norway)
 Pohjola Insurance building (1901, Finland)
 Polytechnic Students' Union or Sampo Building (1903, Finland)
 Röhss Museum (Röhsska konstslöjdsmuseet) (1916, Sweden)
 Stockholm City Hall (Stockholms stadshus) (1923, Sweden)
 Stockholm Court House (Stockholms Rådhus) (1915, Sweden)
 Taagepera Castle (Taagepera mõis) (1912, Estonia)
 Tarvaspää, (1913, Finland) the house and studio built for himself by Finnish painter Akseli Gallen-Kallela
 Tolstoy House (Толстовский дом) (1912, Russia)
 Church of the Epiphany (Uppenbarelsekyrkan) (1913, Sweden)
 Vålerenga Church (Vålerenga kirke) (1902, Norway)
 Saint Thérèse of the Child Jesus Church (1932, Barcelona)

Sweden

Finland

Estonia

Denmark

Russia

See also
 List of architectural styles

References

State archives: Swedish National Romantic architecture

External links

 01
Architectural styles
Scandinavian architecture
Architecture in Denmark
Architecture in Finland
Architecture in Norway
Architecture in Sweden
Art Nouveau architecture
Architectural history
19th-century architectural styles
20th-century architectural styles